Miconia vesca is a species of plant in the family Melastomataceae. It is endemic to Ecuador. Miconia vesca is considered an endangered species due to habitat destruction.

References

vesca
Endemic flora of Ecuador
Endangered flora of South America
Taxonomy articles created by Polbot